Shaun Webb (born 30 December 1981) is a New Zealand born Japanese rugby union footballer who plays as a fullback. Webb was part of the Japan squad at the 2011 Rugby World Cup. He obtained Japanese citizenship in July 2011, a month before the 2011 Rugby World Cup.

References

External links 
 

1981 births
Living people
Japanese rugby union players
Japan international rugby union players
New Zealand emigrants to Japan
New Zealand expatriate rugby union players
Expatriate rugby union players in Japan
New Zealand expatriate sportspeople in Japan
Coca-Cola Red Sparks players
Green Rockets Tokatsu players
Otago rugby union players
Rugby union players from Blenheim, New Zealand
People educated at Christchurch Boys' High School
Lincoln University (New Zealand) alumni
Canterbury rugby union players
Rugby union fullbacks
Rugby union fly-halves